AKMHS School, Poochatty is an aided Malayalam-medium higher secondary school in Poochatty, a suburban area of Nadathara, Thrissur, Kerala, India, established by Ayyappathu Kochukkuttan in 1953.

Overview 
The school is located in Ollukkara block panchayat of Thrissur district and consists of Grades 5 to 12.

References

External links 

AKM HSS, POOCHATTY
A. K. M. H. S. S. Poochatty

Schools in Thrissur
High schools and secondary schools in Kerala
Educational institutions established in 1953
1953 establishments in India